Pío Sixto Corcuera (17 July 1921 – 22 November 2011) was an Argentine football striker who played most of his career for Boca Juniors.

Career
Born in Buenos Aires, Corcuera joined local Club Atlético Boca Juniors at age 17. He made his senior debut entering as a substitute for the injured Jaime Sarlanga in a league match against San Lorenzo de Almagro on 22 June 1941.

Corcuera won the Argentine championship with Boca Juniors during 1943 and 1944, participating in the two largest-winning margins for the club (11–1 against Club Atlético Tigre and 10–1 against Chacarita Juniors). He finished his career after three seasons with Gimnasia y Esgrima de La Plata, retiring in 1951 at age 29.

Nicknamed "El Cañoncito" (The little cannon) Corcuera won five titles with Boca, and can still be found on the all-time list of Boca Juniors topscorers.

Titles

References

External links

1921 births
2011 deaths
Footballers from Buenos Aires
Argentine footballers
Association football forwards
Argentine Primera División players
Boca Juniors footballers
Club de Gimnasia y Esgrima La Plata footballers